Elections to Down District Council were held on 18 May 1977 on the same day as the other Northern Irish local government elections. The election used three district electoral areas to elect a total of 20 councillors.

Election results

Note: "Votes" are the first preference votes.

Districts summary

|- class="unsortable" align="centre"
!rowspan=2 align="left"|Ward
! % 
!Cllrs
! % 
!Cllrs
! %
!Cllrs
! %
!Cllrs
!rowspan=2|TotalCllrs
|- class="unsortable" align="center"
!colspan=2 bgcolor="" | SDLP
!colspan=2 bgcolor="" | UUP
!colspan=2 bgcolor="" | Alliance
!colspan=2 bgcolor="white"| Others
|-
|align="left"|Area A
|19.9
|2
|bgcolor="40BFF5"|50.1
|bgcolor="40BFF5"|4
|13.5
|1
|16.5
|0
|7
|-
|align="left"|Area B
|bgcolor="#99FF66"|58.8
|bgcolor="#99FF66"|4
|18.4
|1
|8.5
|1
|14.3
|0
|6
|-
|align="left"|Area C
|bgcolor="#99FF66"|53.4
|bgcolor="#99FF66"|4
|26.9
|2
|13.5
|1
|6.2
|0
|7
|- class="unsortable" class="sortbottom" style="background:#C9C9C9"
|align="left"| Total
|44.6
|10
|31.4
|7
|11.8
|3
|12.2
|0
|20
|-
|}

Districts results

Area A

1973: 4 x UUP, 1 x SDLP, 1 x Alliance, 1 x Vanguard
1977: 4 x UUP, 2 x SDLP, 1 x Alliance
1973-1977 Change: SDLP gain from Vanguard

Area B

1973: 3 x SDLP, 1 x UUP, 1 x Alliance, 1 x Independent
1977: 4 x SDLP, 1 x UUP, 1 x Alliance
1973-1977 Change: SDLP gain from Independent

Area C

1973: 4 x SDLP, 3 x UUP
1977: 4 x SDLP, 2 x UUP, 1 x Alliance
1977-1981 Change: Alliance gain from UUP

References

Down District Council elections
Down